Dugommier may refer to:
Dugommier (Paris Métro), a station on Paris Métro Line 6
Jacques François Dugommier (1738–1794), French general